Aletheia is truth or disclosure in philosophy.

Aletheia may also refer to:

 259 Aletheia, a large asteroid
 Aletheia (album), 2013 album by Hope for the Dying
 "Aletheia" (Person of Interest), an episode of the TV series Person of Interest
 Aletheia M. D., author of the 1897 Rationalist's Manual
 Aletheia University, a university in New Taipei, Taiwan
 Alethia, a poetic adaptation of the Book of Genesis into Latin by Claudius Marius Victorius
 Aletheia, the Greek version of Veritas, the Roman goddess of truth

See also
 Alethea, a female given name
 Aleteia, a Catholic news and information website
 Aletheian, a Christian death metal band
 Alethiometer, a "truth teller" device in Philip Pullman's fantasy novel trilogy His Dark Materials